Fonaitika is a village in the municipal unit of Iardanos, Elis, Greece. It is situated at the foot of low hills, 2 km east of Vounargo, 2 km west of Vrochitsa, 2 km southwest of Koryfi and 8 km north of Pyrgos. Its population is 128 people (2011 census).

Population

See also

List of settlements in Elis

References

External links
Fonaitika at the GTP Travel Pages

Iardanos
Populated places in Elis